Tung Lo Wan Road is a road in Causeway Bay and Tai Hang on the north side of Hong Kong Island in Hong Kong. The road joins east with King's Road, Tin Hau Temple Road, Causeway Road and west with Yee Wo Street, Irving Street, Leighton Road and Causeway Road.

History
The road draws the early shore line in the Tung Lo Wan, the native name of Causeway Bay. It was originally part of Shaukiwan Road. In 1883, Hong Kong Government reclaimed part of the bay to present-day Causeway Road. In 1935, the road was renamed to the current name of Tung Lo Wan Road.

Landmarks
Landmarks along Tung Lo Wan Road include (from west to east):
 St. Paul's Convent School
 St. Paul's Hospital
 St. Mary's Church (No. 2A)
 Causeway Bay (Moreton Terrace) Bus Terminus
 Fuk Tak Temple, Tai Hang
 Chinese Recreation Club
 Metropark Hotel Causeway Bay Hong Kong (No. 148)
 Queen's College

See also

 Land reclamation in Hong Kong
 List of streets and roads in Hong Kong

Roads on Hong Kong Island
Causeway Bay
Tai Hang